Vinayak Lohani is the founder of Parivaar, a humanitarian institution based in West Bengal. He, inspired by the spiritual and humanistic ideals of Sri Ramakrishna and Swami Vivekananda, decided to devote his entire life to serving the ‘Divine in Man’ as taught by Swami Vivekananda.

Background, early life and education
Vinayak Lohani was born in Bhopal, Madhya Pradesh and did his schooling there. His family roots are from Almora district of Kumaon region in Uttarakhand, and their family surname was originally Upadhyaya, until a few generations back an ancestor took Lohumi (then changed to Lohani) as a title. His father served in the MP Cadre of the Indian Administrative Service (IAS). He went to IIT Kharagpur to do his B.Tech and thereafter worked for Infosys for a year. In 2001, he joined IIM Calcutta to do his MBA.

Career
At IIM Calcutta, Vinayak opted out of the placement process. After completing the MBA course, with just 3 children in a small rented building and almost no financial resources, he started Parivaar for children from impoverished and destitute backgrounds in late 2003. At the end of 2004, Parivaar purchased its own land and developed its first campus: Parivaar Ashram. In 2011, Parivaar expanded to having separate campuses for boys and girls. As of October 2022, there are more than 1600 resident children (girls and boys) at Parivaar, making it the largest and high-quality residential program for children from impoverished strata in West Bengal.

In 2016–17, Parivaar also started working in Madhya Pradesh. It has started 670 Day Boarding (Meal cum Education centers) for children in selected impoverished tribal and rural pockets called ‘Sri Ramakrishna Vivekananda Seva Kutir’ in 15 districts. At these Kutirs more than 60000 children are getting nutritious meals (breakfast and dinner) along with Strongly Supplementary education and Life-Skills over morning and evening shifts. Apart from these, Parivaar also runs 133 free 24*7 ambulances across 25 districts and 17 mobile health clinics in 11 districts of Madhyapradesh. Four Residential Institutions in Madhya Pradesh (Dewas, Mandla & Sehore districts) for tribal students are also in operation.

Awards and honors
 National Award for Child Welfare 2011 presented by the President of India at the Rashtrapati Bhavan.
 Sanskriti Award, India's premier award for young achievers in 2011 from the Former President of India Dr A. P. J. Abdul Kalam.
 CNN-IBN’s Young Indian Leader of the Year Award 2012.
 IIM Calcutta’s Distinguished Alumnus Award (1 of 9 recipients out of 8000 alumni).
 IIT Kharagpur’s ‘Distinguished Alumnus Award’ (youngest recipient in the history of the award) awarded in 2014.
 Swami Ranganathananda Memorial Humanitarian Award 2014 presented at the Ramakrishna Mission Institute of Culture Calcutta.
 Swami Rama Humanitarian Award 2015 presented by Hon. Chief Minister of Uttarakhand.
 Vivekananda Seva Samman 2015 presented by Hon. Governor, West Bengal.
 Bhaorao Deoras Seva Samman 2015 presented at Lucknow by Hon Governor, Uttar Pradesh.
 Telegraph ‘Special Honour’ conferred by Telegraph Education Foundation Calcutta in 2014.
 ‘True Legends Award’ presented by ‘The Telegraph’ in association with ‘100 Pipers’ in April 2015.
 Spirit of Mastek Award conferred by the Mastek Corporation.
 Karmaveer Puraskaar Award presented by the International Confederation of NGOs in 2011.
 ‘Transforming India through Transforming Indians’ felicitation from Chinmaya Mission Kolkata.
 Rotary Club of Calcutta Megacity Vocational Excellence Award 2012.
 Rotary Club of Calcutta Metropolitan Vocational Excellence Award 2014.

Current Roles with Government of India
 Induction into Central Advisory Board of Education (CABE) (2015 onwards), the apex consultational forum in Ministry of Human Resource Development (India).
 Induction into the National Committee for Promotion of Social and Economic Welfare constituted by the Ministry of Finance, Government of India (2014-2017).
 Inducted into the Governing Board of Childline India Foundation (2014 onwards), constituted by the Ministry of Women and Child Development (India) which manages 24-hour child helpline services across nearly 350 towns in India.
 Inducted as a Member of Bharat Rural Livelihood Foundation (BRLF) (2015 onwards), set up by the Ministry of Rural Development, Government of India, as a funding and capacity-building institution towards accelerating sustainable action in the domain of rural livelihoods.
 Induction into Government of India's Ministry of Women and Child's Working Group for the Twelfth Five Year Plan (2011).

References

External links 
 Parivaar Website
 

Living people
Indian Institute of Management Calcutta alumni
IIT Kharagpur alumni
Indian social entrepreneurs
Businesspeople from Bhopal
Businesspeople from Kolkata
1978 births